The BYD K-series bus (sometimes just referred to as the BYD ebus or BYD electric bus) are a line of battery electric buses manufactured by the Chinese automaker BYD, powered with its self-developed lithium iron phosphate battery, featuring a typical operating range of  per charge under urban road conditions. The rear axle is powered by two electric traction motors; the battery capacity and motor power of each model varies depending on the nominal length and passenger capacity.

History and development

The first BYD battery electric K-series bus was manufactured on 30 September 2010 in Changsha city of Hunan province. Previously, BYD had built transit bus models like F3DM, F6DM and e6. K9 has a 12-meter body length and 18-ton weight with one-step low-floor interior. It is reportedly priced at 2–3 million yuan (S$395,000 S$592,600).

The K-series bus has been sold to operators in China, India, Japan, Hong Kong, United States, Colombia, Chile, Spain, Netherlands, Denmark, Aruba and Singapore.

The company extended its production base in Tianjin, China at the end of July, 2012 and may plan to manufacture in Brazil and Windsor, Canada. BYD built and operates an electric bus factory in Lancaster, California, US. The new factory started production in October 2013. In December 2014, another manufacturing plant began operation in Dalian, Liaoning, China.

Specifications 
BYD model numbers (e.g., K9) include K (designating "transit bus") and a number (designating nominal length; larger numbers indicate longer buses).

Various letter suffixes have been applied, including:
 M: North American market
 R: right-hand drive
 S: Double-decker bus
 ER: Extended Range

Notes

BYD's official published specifications for its K9 electric bus include:
 Electric power consumption: less than 100kWh/60mins
 Acceleration: 0–50 km/h in 20s
 Top speed: 96 km/h
 Normal charge: 6h for full charge
 Fast charge: 1h for full charge
 Overnight charging: 60 kW maximum power for 5h full charge
 Range:  ( according to some reports)
 Length × Width × Height: 
 Standard seats: 31+1 (31 for passengers and 1 for driver)
 Weight: 
 Clearance between one-step entry and ground: 
Two or more versions of this bus have been delivered. The two-door version is in service in China's Shenzhen, Changsha, Xi'an and Shaoguan while the 3-door version operates in Shenzhen, Bogota etc. for test and demonstration purposes.

Battery and powertrain 
The K-series buses are powered by LiFePO4 batteries developed by BYD, which also have been applied to BYD e6, BYD DESS and other energy storage products. BYD claims that the chemical materials contained in the battery can be recycled without any toxins. Battery capacities range from approximately 100 to 600 kWh, depending on the fitted drive axle and bus size.

The drivetrain uses an in-hub motor and reduction gear for each wheel on the drive axle. At least three distinct axles are offered:
 2× and 2× (K7, K8, K9)
 2× and 2× (K8, K9)
 2× and 2× (K9, K11)

Solar panels fixed on the vehicle were once reported to supplement the onboard batteries. They were included on demo units, but not on units sold commercially.

Safety
Safety features include unitary construction body, 4-wheel disc brakes, ABS+ASR, one-step easy-pass with special footplates for wheelchair access and non-step inside.

Body and interior design

The body comes silver, yellow or green (for different markets). In the silver version the front windscreen occupies two-thirds of the front of the bus for maximum visibility. It includes adjustable leather seating for driver and red and black leather seats for passengers. The battery packs are laid in the vehicle rear on both sides inside the two cabins.

Costs

BYD calculates that a BYD ebus over 8 years saves about $190,000 in energy costs. In 2012, the price for a BYD ebus was 380,000 Euros, 100,000 more than a comparable diesel bus.

Evaluations and comparisons
To qualify for federal subsidies in the United States, heavy-duty transit buses must be assembled domestically (under the requirements of the "Buy America Act") and pass durability testing for an accelerated equivalent 12-year period at the Pennsylvania Transportation Institute in Altoona, Pennsylvania. To meet these requirements, BYD has opened a bus production facility in Lancaster, California in 2013 and K7 (2017), K8 (2021), K9 (2014), and K11 (2020) buses have been tested at Altoona.

In addition, LADOT and Long Beach Transit have conducted long-term comparison tests between BYD battery-electric buses and similarly-sized buses fueled with compressed natural gas. It was noted that consumption increased during summer months, presumably due to the use of air conditioning systems.

Policies 
At a press conference in Beijing on 4 November 2012, BYD announced "Zero vehicle purchase price, Zero costs, Zero emissions", to promote the sale of its e6 and K9. The initiative is supported financially by China Development Bank from a fund totalling over 30 Billion RMB ($4.6B USD), and allows buyers to finance 100% of the purchase price with no down payment, paying a lease rate that effectively costs less than regular monthly operational expenses.

Under the scheme, available in China, public transport operators can choose the ownership model from three different options:

The company explained the concept of "Zero Costs" by comparing difference between the five-year cost of running a conventional taxi in Shenzhen, as against its all-electric taxicab. It came to the conclusion that "if the car runs for 5 years, and the total saving over 5 years is deducted from the higher cost of the vehicle and the interest on multiple payments, it can save 326,400 RMB. The company also claimed that if enough distance is covered, "the vehicle payment will be entirely offset". BYD also promoted the "Zero Emission" feature of its renewable-energy vehicles by stating that "an e6 electric taxi saves 14,120 litres of fuel per year, with 32 tonnes fewer CO2 emissions", and "169 million litres of fuel could be saved with CO2 emissions reduced by 38.62 million tonnes per year" if all Chinese taxis were to be replaced with its electric vehicles.

Global deployment

Worldwide 
In both 2011 and 2012, BYD obtained orders from amounting to 1200+ units.

In 2015, BYD sold about 6,000 of these buses worldwide. BYD became the world leader in the sale of electric vehicles in 2015.

Mainland China 
 200 units were delivered to the Shenzhen public transmit system to serve the Universiade 2011 in August, 2011 and remained as part of this city's transport system.
 2 buses began trial service in Changsha 100 more were expected to begin service there in 2012. BYD's Changsha facility was to produce 20,000 passenger vehicles and 400 pure electric buses, increasing to 3,000 electric buses and 100,000 passenger vehicles in 2013.
 3 K9s began service in Shaoguan, Guangdong province on November 3, 2011.
 4 K8s began service in Xi'an in August 2012 with another 46 units expected to join them around the end of 2012.
 Haikou City began testing K9s in August 2011.
 In July 2012 BYD and Tianjin Public Transportation Group Ltd agreed to set up a joint venture to produce new energy vehicles. It became the company's second K9 production site in mainland China.
 The largest K9 fleet since 2014 was in Dalian, 600 units. A further 600 vehicles was planned to arrive in 2015.
 In May 2014 BYD announced an order of 2000 ebuses and 1000 eTaxis for Hangzhou. As of 2014 China about 500,000 conventional city buses were in daily use. BYD sold in 2014 in the first quarter more than 4,000 vehicles, while sales of former market leader Daimler dropped by 20% in 2013.

North America 

In the North American transit bus market, the K-series bus is sold with several different nominal lengths, powertrain options, and battery capacities.

 BYD announced its bus in the US at the 16th BUSCON in Chicago on September 13, 2011. BYD supplied one K9 bus to be retrofitted with WAVE's wireless charging pad under the bus, developed by the Utah State University Energy Dynamics Laboratory in 2012.
 The city of Windsor, Ontario signed a letter of intent to order as many as 10 BYD electric buses in May 2012. The plan failed with no plant built in Windsor and no orders made by Transit Windsor.
 BYD has supplied the Los Angeles Metro system with buses since 2015. A 2018 investigation by the Los Angeles Times found serious reliability issues with the BYD buses.
 Aruba plans to use BYD by 2020. The country signed a memorandum of understanding (MOU) with BYD to place four BYD buses and one e6 electric taxi for public/government use, to be in service by the end of September 2013.
 The Denver’s Regional Transportation District purchased 36 BYD K10MR buses for use on their MallRide service.
 TransLink, which services Vancouver, British Columbia began a three-month trial of BYD bus in May 2017.
University of California, Irvine acquired 20 BYD electric buses for its Anteater Express shuttle service in 2018 in a $15 million lease-to-own deal, becoming the first college in the US to convert to an all-electric fleet.
 Anaheim Transportation Network, which serves the Disneyland and Disney California Adventure theme parks with its Anaheim Resort Transportation service, awarded a 40-bus order to BYD in May 2019, including a mix of K7M, K9M, and K11M buses. The contract was later increased to 42 buses, and the first two were delivered in 2020.
 Toronto Transit Commission received their first two K9M buses in January 2020 and remaining 8 in February 2020.
 The San Francisco Municipal Railway procured three BYD K9M buses as part of a battery-electric bus evaluation during 2021 and 2022. In total twelve BEBs will be evaluated during the pilot program, including buses from competitors New Flyer (XE40), Proterra (ZX5), and Nova Bus (LFSe).

South America 

 On June 20, 2012, BYD and Chilean collaborator INDUMOTORA Company secured a contract with ALSACIA, one of the biggest operators in Santiago's public transport system, for 5 K9 units. However up to now, METBUS, another operator of Santiago's public transport system, operates two BYD K9FE units.
 BYD scheduled a large commercial operation of its K9 in Brazil and set up a bus production factory there which, however, is not certified by BYD. The mayor of Sao Paulo, Brazil confirmed plan to introduce at least 5 BYD electric buses to Sao Paulo by the end of 2012.
 At the beginning of 2012, BYD and Buquebus officials signed a contract to begin importing 500 buses into Uruguay. According to Bernama, the first buses would arrive in Uruguay before during 2012 with 500 buses running by 2015.
 BYD entered a fuel-efficiency testing program in Colombia run by the Clinton Climate Initiative (CCI) and InterAmerican Development Bank (IADB). Running against diesel and CNG-hybrid buses on a 12-mile route that took between 60 and 90 minutes to complete, BYD won by achieving a 7.3 km/liter-equivalent by measuring costs and 11 km/liter-equivalent measuring by energy output. Peru has also tested BYD's electric bus. A fleet of 12-meter 80-passenger units was to be delivered to Bogotá for trial operation as of Q2 2013. The first one-month stage of this project was to focus on testing the fleet on operational performance, energy consumption, battery behavior and total energy consumption. BYD has delivered 800 units as of sep-2022 and is expected to deliver 1002 units.
 In December 2018, 100 units were added to the public transport system of Santiago de Chile, together with the first charge terminal for electric buses in Latin America.

Asia Pacific 

 Hong Kong: In July, 2011, the BYD Hong Kong Research and Development Center opened with a group of six engineers, in cooperation with its existing development team. The Kowloon Motor Bus fleet reportedly ordered 10 buses from BYD. The first unit arrived in September 2012. The public transit service planned to test the units on three transmit lines. The Kowloon Motor Bus BYD bus was eventually returned to BYD. However, KMB ordered 10 BYD K9R with Gemilang body and delivered in 2017. Long Win Bus ordered 4 BYD K9R with Gemilang body and delivered in 2017. Citybus and NWFB ordered 5 BYD K9R Electric buses from BYD Auto of China.
  India:
In December 2013, Bangalore Metropolitan Transport Corporation planned to start a three-month test of a K9. Even Pune has a few of these buses.
In 2018 June 18 Kerala State Road Transport Corporation started trial run in Trivandrum city.
Kadamba Transport Corporation, in Goa, took the delivery of thirty Olectra-BYD K9 electric buses, assembled by Olectra (MEIL), in April 2021. Twenty more electric buses were delivered in December 2021.
 Malaysia: In February 2014, BYD won the bid to supply 15 buses to Rapid Bus, a Prasarana Malaysia subsidiary. Rapid Bus will be using the 15 electric buses as shuttle buses on Kuala Lumpur's first BRT line on elevated guideway exclusively for electric buses namely BRT Sunway Line. It is world's first all-electric Bus Rapid Transit system. Since April 2022, some of the buses also using at normal bus routes.
 Thailand: On 2015, BYD will deliver K9RA buses. It will be available through the official BMTA has partnered with Loxley Plc.
 Philippines: In May 2018, BYD announced it will deliver ten buses to the Philippines. It will be available through the official Philippine distributor Columbian Motors Corporation (CMC) sales network.
 Japan: In February 2015, Kyotokyukou Bus Inc. of Kyoto, Japan, took delivery of five BYD electric buses, making BYD the first Chinese auto company to enter the Japanese market.
 Singapore:
SMRT Corporation, Singapore's premier multi-modal transport service provider signed an MOU in June 2011 with BYD to consider a joint venture to distribute BYD's electric buses and e6 taxis in Singapore.
 Go-Ahead Singapore together with Land Transport Authority delivered its first fully electric bus. It will undergo vigorous testing and be put to service for trial runs for six months. The bus made its debut on 7 November 2016 on Service 17. After that, it went on hiatus, before coming back on Service 119 on February.
In 2019, the Land Transport Authority of Singapore ordered 20 BYD K9 with Gemilang body. An initial five entered service on 29 July 2020, with all remaining buses entering service by November 2020.
South Korea: In September 2020, BYD won an order for 18 units in the electric bus supply business for Seoul city buses. Delivery started from December 2020.
Indonesia: 
In April 2019, TransJakarta took pre-trial on some electric buses company, including BYD K9 and C6.
In July 2020, TransJakarta took trial run on K9 and C6 for public with free of charge for three months.
In March 2022, Mayasari Bakti operates 30 units for TransJakarta in non-BRT routes

Oceania 
 NZ Bus is trialling a BYD eBus for up to three months in Auckland and Wellington from February 2017.
 Brisbane Airport purchased several modified BYD K9 (with three doors) for shuttle service between domestic and international terminals, starting from 2019.
 Transit Systems NSW acquired four BYD K9RAs bodied by Gemilang as part of an electric bus trial for 2 years, commencing in July 2019.

Middle East 
 In August 2012, a contract for 700 electric bus delivery was completed between BYD and Israeli transit company Dan Bus. The first buses were expected to be deployed in 2012. Based on the market price of 2.1 million yuan (US$330,000), the contract is estimated to be worth 1.5 billion yuan (US$236.65 million). The contract was BYD's largest order to date from a public transport operator outside of China.

Europe 
BYD electric bus has been tested in European countries including Denmark, Finland, Germany, Hungary Italy, the Netherlands, Portugal and Spain in cities such as Bremen and Bonn, Helsinki, Coimbra, Amsterdam, Copenhagen, Milan, Madrid, Barcelona, Athens and Warsaw.
 Finland: on March 12, 2012, BYD and a Finland-based transportation company, Veolia Transport Finland Oy, reached an agreement for K9s for the Finnish capital city Helsinki. BYD's K9 buses were to undergo a three-year performance test under Finland's conditions of extreme cold.
 Germany: BYD signed a letter of intent with Frankfurt, Germany to supply three K9s and two charging stations by the end of the first quarter of 2012. The buses were to serve as shuttles at Frankfurt Airport and along public transportation routes. In October 2020, BYD supplied 22 of K9s for BOGESTRA and HCR in the city of Bochum, Gelsenkirchen and Herne.
 Italy: in 2014, ATM, got two K9s for test the electric bus in Milan.In 2015, the Piedmont Region, issued the first Italian tender for full-size ebuses, won by BYD: in October 2017 the buses began operating, 20 buses were delivered to GTT for Turin city routes and 3 buses were delivered to SUN for Novara city routes.In 2018, 4 K9s were delivered to Busitalia, a FS Group company, the Padua city bus operator.
 Netherlands: the island of Schiermonnikoog in the province of Friesland introduced six new, long-range, K9s in April 2013 after BYD scored the highest in meeting program goals and won an order for the six buses and a 15-year maintenance contract from a European open bid supported by four major bus manufacturers.35 BYD K9s are in service as airportbus between the terminal and B-gate's at Amsterdam Schiphol Airport since 2015. The busses are adapted for the airport use and charged via a solar powerstation at the airport.Several other public transport authorities throughout the Netherlands have BYD K9s on order. In 2020 250 BYD K9s started operating in the eastern Netherlands, it is the largest electric bus fleet in Europe that was implemented overnight.
 Poland: In 2013 the capital city of Poland, Warszawa (Warsaw), tested K-9. BYD claims about 3 hours of charging time were not confirmed: the minimum was over 5 hours. 250 km range was found, less than the required 350 km. Also, the same buses were tested in Kraków.
 Spain: A successful two-week road test of BYD electric bus was conducted by the two main Spanish municipal public transportation companies: EMT (Madrid) and TMB (Barcelona).
 United Kingdom: In 2013 two units began operating on two central London routes; said to be the capital's first fully electric buses. Transport for London planned to purchase six more BYD buses in 2014. In July 2015, Go-Ahead London confirmed they would order 51 BYD electric buses with Alexander Dennis Enviro200 MMC bodywork. In March 2016, the first of a fleet of 5 double decker electric buses was launched by Metroline with an extended range of 190 miles. In 2016, Nottingham Community Transport received a batch for the park and ride services.

Competitors
North America:
 ENC Axess-BEB: Full-sized rigid bus
 Gillig Low Floor: Mid- and full-sized rigid buses
 GreenPower Motor Company EV250, EV350, and EV550: Mid- and full-sized rigid single- and double-deck buses
 New Flyer Xcelsior CHARGE: Full-sized rigid and articulated buses
 Nova Bus LFSe: Full-sized rigid and articulated buses
 Proterra Catalyst and ZX5: Full-sized rigid buses
Europe:

 Solaris Urbino electric buses
 Mercedes eCitaro
 MAN Lion's City E
 Volvo 7900 Electric
 Irizar ie bus and ie tram

References

External links

 
 
 

BYD Auto
ebus
Vehicles introduced in 2010
Buses of China
Buses of the United States
Battery electric buses
Low-floor buses
Single-deck buses